The 2014 Ronde van Gelderland was a one-day women's cycle race held in the Netherlands on 20 April 2014. The race had a UCI rating of 1.2.

Results

See also
 2014 in women's road cycling

References

Ronde van Gelderland
Ronde van Gelderland
Ronde van Gelderland
April 2014 sports events in Europe